Aragon High School is a public co-educational high school in San Mateo, California. It is part of the San Mateo Union High School District (SMUHSD). It is located in San Mateo County, a large suburb just outside San Francisco. The school is accredited by the Western Association of Schools and Colleges (WASC).

History
Aragon High School was established in 1961 to accommodate development and population growth in San Mateo. The campus is located in the affluent Foothill Terrace neighborhood to the north of State Route 92 and west of State Route 82 (El Camino Real), on the border with the town of Hillsborough.

Campus 
Aragon's campus surrounds a grassy center court, which is also home to the school's swimming pool. The main office, attendance office, and guidance, college, and career center are located west of center court. To the north and south are A-E halls, which contain a majority of the classrooms. To the east are the school's two gyms. In 2012, the Career Technical Education (CTE) building was completed, which houses biotech labs, a robotics shop, and a media arts classroom. In 2013, a new 600-seat theater was completed. Aragon's campus includes eight tennis courts, softball field, baseball field, track and football field, and two basketball courts.

Statistics

Demographics
2017-2018
 1,639 students: 814 male (49.7%), 825 female (50.3%)  

Approximately 21.9% of the students at Aragon are served by the free or reduced-price lunch program.

Standardized testing

Rankings
Aragon High School has been recognized nationally for its academic excellence.  In 2015 it was ranked the 100th best public high school in the country by Newsweek.  In 2013 U.S. News & World Report ranked it 379th nationally.  In 2012 it was ranked 689th nationally by The Washington Post.

Notable alumni

Robert Bazell: 1963, chief NBC science and health correspondent 
Linda Bilmes: 1976, Harvard professor at the Kennedy School of Government
Ted Chen: 1984, reporter and weekend anchor, KNBC Channel 4, Los Angeles
Justin Christian: 1998, former Major League Baseball player
James P. Connolly, comedian; TV and radio host
Steve Gibson: Software engineer and IT security journalist
Ann Kiyomura: Wimbledon ladies' doubles tennis champion
Brad Lewis: 1976, Academy Award winner for producing Ratatouille; former mayor of San Carlos, California
Natalie Nunn: 2003, one of the Bad Girls Club girls, Season 4 (Episodes 1–11)
Darick Robertson: comic book artist for DC Comics, Marvel Comics, Malibu Comics, and Acclaim Comics; designed and drew the mascot, in 1984, that Aragon is using to this day 
Neal Schon: guitarist for Santana and Journey
Kristen Sze: News anchor for KGO-TV in San Francisco
Manase Tonga: 2002, former National Football League and United Football League fullback
Matangi Tonga: former Arena Football League and National Football League linebacker
Sam Tuivailala, 2010: Major League Baseball pitcher for the Seattle Mariners
Eddie Williams: 2005, former National Football League fullback
Pegi Young: 1971,  singer, songwriter, environmentalist and co-founder of the Bridge School

See also

 San Mateo County high schools

References

External links
 Aragon's homepage
 Aragon High School athletics
 Aragon High School student newspaper (Outlook)
 Great Schools profile

Educational institutions established in 1961
High schools in San Mateo County, California
Public high schools in California
1961 establishments in California